Greenpoint Hospital (300 Skillman Avenue) opened in 1914 and closed in 1982. As of 2016 final disposition of the hospital site's ten buildings
were still pending.

History
The hospital initially had six buildings. Talk in 1959 of closing part of the hospital pending "modernization" and a 1968 "crash program to remedy decaying conditions" were part of the hospital's last decades.

At the time of Greenpoint'''s closing, Woodhull Medical and Mental Health Center was deemed to be the community's replacement. Controversy over this matter existed since Woodhull "was completed in 1978 but stood empty for four years
because the city said it could not afford to operate it." Even when it opened, it was noted that Woodhull is "five miles away." A subsequent study confirmed that "the amount of time it would take for a vehicle to reach Woodhull from various points in Greenpoint" averaged "just under 40 minutes."

The closing was followed by a series of unkept promises to the neighborhood: instead of a nursing home or senior housing, it became a shelter for homeless men, with the words "a dumping ground" used by neighborhood activists, particularly a 1970s-founded group named Neighborhood Women. It took eight years to reduce the number of men in the facility from "more than 1,100" to 200. By 2010 the city was still promising to use it for affordable housing. In 2016, although some units had been built, the New York Times summarized the situation as another promise:
"more participants will bring fresh ideas for this valuable city land."

The hospital had been described as a "10-building complex" and many in the neighborhood claimed they "at least need a substation to keep our people alive in times of emergency." Money had been spent four years prior to build "an emergency wing" and the request resulted in a nine month study which asked "Can a 24-hour emergency facility maintain itself while the other buildings on the grounds are put to alternative uses?"Greenpoint's closing was followed a year later by that of another neighborhood hospital, Cumberland, both of which were to be "an exchange" for over-half-an-hour-away Woodhull'', "one of the most modern and expensive hospitals in the world." Another option had been explored in 1964: "Greenpoint Hospital should be relocated and enlarged, and Kings County Hospital beds should be decreased."

References

External links
 1930 census. Institution(s): Greenpoint Hospital

  

Defunct hospitals in Brooklyn
Hospitals established in 1914
1914 establishments in New York City
Hospitals disestablished in 1982
1982 disestablishments in New York (state)
Greenpoint, Brooklyn